Mylvaganam Thilakarajah (born 29 September 1973) is a Sri Lankan trade unionist, politician and Member of Parliament.

Early life
Thilakarajah was born on 29 September 1973. He was educated at Highlands College, Hatton and St. Theresa's Girls College, Kilinochchi. After school he joined the University of Colombo, graduating with a B.Com. degree. He also holds a diploma in journalism from the university and is currently studying for a LL.B. from the Open University of Sri Lanka.

Career
Thilakarajah is general-secretary of the Workers' Nation Front and deputy general-secretary of the National Union of Workers.

Thilakarajah was one of the United National Front for Good Governance's (UNFGG) candidates in Nuwara Eliya District at the 2015 parliamentary election. He was elected and entered Parliament.

Electoral history

References

1973 births
Alumni of the University of Colombo
Living people
Indian Tamil politicians of Sri Lanka
Indian Tamil trade unionists of Sri Lanka
Members of the 15th Parliament of Sri Lanka
People from Central Province, Sri Lanka